"Travellers Tune" is a song by English rock band Ocean Colour Scene. American soul singer P. P. Arnold provides additional vocals on the track. The song was released on 25 August, 1997, as the second single from the band's third studio album, Marchin' Already (1997), and reached number five on the UK Singles Chart.

Track listings
UK CD single
 "Travellers Tune"
 "Song for the Front Row"
 "On the Way Home"
 "All God's Children Need Travelling Shoes"

UK 7-inch and cassette single
 "Travellers Tune"
 "Song for the Front Row"

Personnel
Personnel are taken from the UK CD single liner notes and the Marchin' Already album booklet.
 Ocean Colour Scene – writing, production, recording, mixing, engineering
 Simon Fowler – vocals, guitar
 Steve Cradock – guitar, piano
 Damon Minchella – bass guitar
 Oscar Harrison – drums
 P. P. Arnold – additional vocals
 Brendan Lynch – production, recording, mixing, engineering
 Martyn "Max" Heyes – production, engineering

Charts

References

Ocean Colour Scene songs
1997 singles
1997 songs
MCA Records singles
Song recordings produced by Brendan Lynch (music producer)